X-Men: The Hidden Years was a comic book series published by Marvel Comics, which starred the company's popular superhero team, the X-Men.  It was written by John Byrne, with illustrations by Byrne and Tom Palmer.

Publication history
The series was intended to fill in the team's chronology during the early 1970s when the original X-Men comic (#67–93) was publishing only reprints of earlier issues. According to Byrne, the series "was clearly finite, since [Giant-Size X-Men #1] was out there as an "end point" for my series, but the way I had it worked out, I could have easily done 100 issues or more before I had to send the team off to Krakoa." However, as part of a retooling of the X-Men line, X-Men: The Hidden Years was cancelled, prematurely ending its run with issue #22.

Hidden Years featured the cast of the original X-Men and their villains, with a few appearances by characters who had not otherwise appeared at that point in time, such as Storm and the Phoenix Force.

See also
Untold Tales of Spider-Man
X-Men: First Class

Bibliography
X-Men #94 (November, 1999) (10 page story set between UXM #66 and THY #1)
X-Men: The Hidden Years #1-22 (December, 1999 – September, 2001)
X-Men: The Hidden Years - The Ghost and the Darkness (contains X-Men: The Hidden Years #1-7) 
X-Men: The Hidden Years - Volume One (contains X-Men: The Hidden Years #01-12 and excerpts from X-Men #94) 
X-Men: The Hidden Years - Volume Two (contains X-Men: The Hidden Years #13-22)

Notes

References

X-Men titles
1999 comics debuts
Comics by John Byrne (comics)
Defunct American comics